The Rousse Philharmonic Orchestra was a Bulgarian orchestra working between 1948–2010. Some of the best Bulgarian conductors—Konstantin Iliev, Dobrin Petkov, Sasha Popov, Russlan Raychev, Ilia Temkov, Alexander Vladigerov, Tzanko Delibozov and Georgi Dimitrov among others, have worked with this orchestra. Since 2005 the General Music Director of the Rousse Philharmonic Orchestra is Maestro Nayden Todorov.

History
The first international music festival in Bulgaria was established in 1961 on the initiative and the organization of Rousse Philharmonic, which transformed this Danubian city, already famed for its architecture and character, into an attractive international music center. That festival, called March Music Days, is held annually in the middle of March, and is a gathering point for famous orchestras, singers, instrumentalists, composers and conductors. In 1966 the Rousse Philharmonic Orchestra was the organizer of the Winter Music Evenings festival—the first of its kind in Bulgaria.

The concert stage of the orchestra has welcomed many famous conductors, such as Kurt Mazur, Rolf Kleinert, Carol Stria, Carlo Zecchi, Helmut Koch, Valeri Gergiev, Evgenii Svetlanov, as well as soloists - Salvatore Accardo, Ruggiero Ricci, Daniel Stefan, Svetoslav Richter, Franco Petraci, Yuri Bashmet, Katya Richarelli, Robert Kohen, Igor Oistrach, Vladimir Spivakov, Jacob Zach, Michail Voscressenski among others. The Rousse Philharmonic Orchestra was pleased to host the famous Russian composer Dmitry Shostakovich in 1958 and in 1965. From 1975 until 1992 the orchestra was an active participant in Accademia Chigia Sienna, Italy.

The names of Franco Ferrara, Carlo Maria Giulini, Genady Rozdestvensky, Bruno Bartolletti, Ferdinand Leitner often appear on concert programs and in numerous collaborations. The orchestra's repertoire includes a broad spectrum of genres and styles—including works from the early music period and contemporary composers. In the rich performing history of the orchestra one can find major musical pieces, such as Prokofiev's Ivan Grozny and Alexander Nevsky, Stravinsky's Oedipus, Petrushka, and The Rite of Spring, Richard Strauss's Also sprach Zarathustra, Carl Orff's Carmina Burana, etc. The Rousse Philharmonic Orchestra toured in Austria, Germany, Italy, Poland, Romania, Spain, France and Switzerland in addition to its well-appreciated tour programme in Bulgaria. The orchestra has recorded with Bulgarian National Radio and the Balkanton record company, and has released many CDs.

Opera and Philharmonic Society 
Opera & Philharmonic Society Rousse was established in 1999 joining the outstanding potentialities of the Rousse State Opera and Rousse Philharmonic Orchestra – two of the leading cultural institutions of Bulgaria. It presents opera, ballet as well as symphony works, and over the last years becomes one of the most expressive formations with remarkable soloists and excellent conductors.

The Opera & Philharmonic Society has at its disposal two halls – a concert one equipped with a recording studio and a nice Opera House. Both halls have more than 600 seats each. The Opera & Philharmonic Society possesses technical means for producing theatrical sceneries.

General Music Director 
The General Music Director of the Rousse State Opera and the Rousse Philharmonic Orchestra Nayden Todorov studied with Karl Osterreicher and Uros Lajovic in Vienna. He conducted major orchestras across Europe and America, as well as in Israel. Maestro Todorov was a resident conductor of the Israel Northern Symphony in Haifa. In 1997 he organized the First festival "Thracia Summer". Todorov commands a vast repertoire and is one of the most respected young conductors in the music world. Nayden Todorov has recorded over a hundred compact discs for Naxos, Balkanton, RENT Music, MMO, Danacord, IMI and Hungaroton and has also created several music productions for various radio and TV stations. Also, he is the Principal Guest Conductor of the much-lauded Sofia Philharmonic Orchestra.

External links
 Opera & Philharmonic Society Rousse
 Rousse Municipality
 Rousse Philharmonic Orchestra Website

1948 establishments in Bulgaria
2010 disestablishments in Bulgaria
Bulgarian orchestras
Disbanded orchestras
Musical groups established in 1948
Musical groups disestablished in 2010
Philharmonic Orchestra